Leeds was a federal electoral district represented in the House of Commons of Canada from 1904 to 1979. It was located in the province of Ontario. This riding was first created in 1903 from parts of Leeds North and Grenville North and Leeds South ridings.

It was initially defined to consist of the county of Leeds, excluding parts included in the electoral district of Brockville. The Brockville riding  was initially defined as the Town of Brockville and the Township of Elizabethtown. From 1882 to 1903 it included the Township of Kitley and from 1903 to 1914 it also included the Townships of Yonge and Escott, Front, Yonge and Escott, Rear and the village of Athens. 

It 1914, it was redefined to consist of the whole county of Leeds, including the town of Brockville. In 1966 it added the Townships of North Burgess, North Elmsley and Montague excepting the Village of Merrickville from Lanark County.

The electoral district was abolished in 1976 when it was redistributed between Lanark—Renfrew—Carleton and Leeds—Grenville ridings.

Members of Parliament

This riding has elected the following Members of Parliament:

Election results

|}

|}

|}

On Mr. George Taylor's resignation on 25 October 1911:

|}

|}

|}

|}

|}

|}

On Mr. Stewart's acceptance of an office of emolument under the Crown, 7 August 1930:

|}

|}

|}

|}

|}

|}

|}

|}

On Mr. Stanton's death, 8 December 1960:

|}

|}

|}

|}

|}

|}

|}

See also 

 List of Canadian federal electoral districts
 Past Canadian electoral districts

External links 
 Parliamentary website

 

Former federal electoral districts of Ontario